US Naval Base New Guinea was number of United States Navy bases on the Island of New Guinea (Papua New Guinea, Dutch New Guinea and British New Guinea) during World War II.  Australia entered World War II on 3 September 1939, being a self-governing nation within the British Empire. The United States formally entered the war on 7 December 1941, following the Empire of Japan bombing of Pearl Harbor. Following the attack on Pearl Harbor Japan quickly took over much of the South Pacific. The United States lost key Naval Bases in the South Pacific including: Naval Base Manila and Naval Base Subic Bay lost in the 1941 invasion of the Philippines. Also lost was Naval Base Guam and Wake Atoll. As such the United States Armed Forces needed new bases in the South West Pacific for staging attacks on Japan's southern empire, the United States built bases first in Australia, then in New Guinea.

History

With the American-British-Dutch-Australian Command (ABDACOM) the Allies tried to limit the advance of Japan. ABDACOM did not have enough troops or supplies to carry out the mission. The northern parts of New Guinea was captured by Japan.   
The US Naval built bases for troops, ships, submarines, PT boats, seaplanes, supply depots, training camps, fleet recreation facilities, and ship repair depots. To keep supplies following the bases were supplied by the vast II United States Merchant Navy. Some of the bases were shared with the Royal Australian Navy and Royal Australian Air Force. By spring 1943, the build up of the US Navy to support the Pacific War had caused overcrowding at the ports on the east coast of Australia. To help the US Navy Seabees departed Naval Base Brisbane on 19 June 1943 to set up a new base in Milne Bay. The Naval Base Milne Bay was a new major United States Navy sea and airbase base built on Milne Bay in Milne Bay Province in south-eastern Papua New Guinea. New Guinea is a tropical rainforest island near the equator. Troops had to battle heavy rains and tropical diseases. After the war in 1945, the New Guinea bases closed.

Japan built a large base at Rabaul on the island of New Britain with 110,000 Japanese troops. Rabaul was invasion bypassed in the island hoping Pacific war efforts. Rabaul was attacked by air and had its supply lines cut off by sea, called Operation Cartwheel, making the neutralisation of Rabaul.

Major bases in New Guinea
Naval Base Milne Bay Fleet Pos Office # 167 codename Edur
Kana Kopa PT Boat Base FPO# 714
Milne Bay Submarine Base
Gilli Gilli Base FPO# 717
Swinger Bay Alotau Base FPO# 818 
Hilimoi Bay hospital FPO# 817
Naval Base Port Moresby FPO# 162
Naval Base Finschhafen FPO# 722 code codename Urom at Dreger Harbour
Naval Base Hollandia FPO# 3115
Naval Base Madang FPO# 928
Naval Base Woodlark Island FPO# 528
Naval Base Merauke
Naval Base Biak Island to support Mokmer Airfield. FPO# 3505
Naval Base Manus, in the Admiralty Islands, just north of New Guinea, including Seeadler Harbor

Minor bases in New Guinea

Naval Base Lae
Naval Base Mios Woendi
Naval Base Fegrusson on Fegrusson Island FPO # 523
Naval Base Samarai Island on Samarai Islands FPO # 421
Naval Base Goodenough Island on Goodenough Island FPO # 724
Naval Base Aitape at Aitape FPO# 927
Naval Base Wewak at Wewak FPO# 3074 
Naval Base Saidor at Saidor FPO# 3086 
Naval Base Sungum FPO# 3088
Naval Base Japen Island on Japen Island
Naval Base Vogelkop on Vogelkop Island
Naval Base Cape Sansapor FPO# 3151 
Naval Base Kornasoren FPO# 3155 and Naval Base Kamirion FPO#3265 on Noemfoor Island in support of Kornasoren Airfields 
Naval Base in Tufi, PT boat base 
Naval Base at Gasmata Fleet Post Office #723 
Naval Base Wakde Island on Wakde Island in support of Wakde Airfield FPO# 3415
Naval Base Noemfoor
Buna, Papua New Guinea – Advanced Base, airfield, PT boat base (Battle of Buna–Gona)
Base on Sasavele Island FPO# 529, part of the Landings on Rendova
Base at Mohile, FPO# 806 
Naval Base Ondonga, FPO# 626, at Ondonga Airfield
Naval Base Cape Gloucester, New Britain FPO# 721
Naval Base Talasea at Talasea, New Britain FPO# 941
Naval Base Hoskins at Hoskins Airport, New Britain FPO# 942
Naval Base Rabaul at Rabaul, New Britain FPO# 3068
Naval Base Nantambu at Nantambu, New Britain FPO# 3422
Naval Base Green Islands at Green Islands after battle PT boat base
Naval Base Emirau in Homestead Lagoon on Emirau Island, New Britain, PT Boat base
Naval Base Kiriwina, at Kiriwina Island, PT boat base and support of Kiriwina Airfield
Naval Base Rein Bay, PT boat base at 
Naval Base Amsterdam Island at Amsterdam Island also called Mios Su
Fergusson Island PT Boat Base

POWs

As in other theaters of war Japan's treatment of POWs and civilians was very poor. Many were exhausted from hunger and disease. Many deaths were caused by the diversion of food, such as rice, to Japanese troops from the New Guinea population. Some were turned into Japan's forced labourers, called romusha. International Red Cross packages were not distributed to POWs. In the New Guinea there were both massacres and executions of POWs:
At the Tol Plantation massacre 160 Australian were executed and at nearby Waitavalo Plantation, another group of eleven Australian prisoners were shot.
On the Japanese destroyer Akikaze on 18 March 1943 German residents from Wewak, New Guinea were executed. About thirty German residents, including German clergymen, nuns with two children were taken after Japan suspected a radio transmitter at Wewak was reporting ship movements to the Americans.
Australian POW, Sgt. Leonard Siffleet, captured in New Guinea, was beheaded in 1943.
Spencer Walklate an Australian Army POW and Eagleton POW were tortured and murdered on Muschu Island a Schouten Islands
The Japanese Lieutenant Hisata Tomiyasu found guilty of killing 14 Indian soldiers and of cannibalism at Wewak in 1944. A common activity in New Guinea.

Gallery

See also
Naval Base Borneo
Axis naval activity in Australian waters
US Naval Advance Bases
List of Royal Australian Navy bases

External links
youtube, World War 2 – Defence of Australia

References

Naval Stations of the United States Navy
World War II airfields in the Pacific Ocean Theater
Airfields of the United States Navy
Military installations closed in the 1940s
Closed installations of the United States Navy